Mahesh Shrinivas Bhupathi (born 7 June 1974) is an Indian former doubles world No. 1 tennis player. In 1997, he became the first Indian to win a major tournament (with Rika Hiraki). With his win at the 2006 Australian Open mixed doubles, he joined the elite group of eight tennis players who have achieved a career Grand Slam in mixed doubles. He is also the founder of International Premier Tennis League. In December 2016, Bhupathi was appointed as India's next non-playing Davis Cup captain and took over the reins from Anand Amritraj in February 2017.

Career

1995–2006
Mahesh Bhupathi is considered one of the top doubles players of the 1990s and 2000s. In 1999, Bhupathi won three doubles titles with Leander Paes, including the French Open and Wimbledon. He and Paes became the first doubles team to reach the finals of all four Grand Slams, the first time such a feat has been achieved in the open era and the first time since 1952. On 26 April of that year, they became the world no. 1 doubles team. Bhupathi also won the US Open mixed doubles with Ai Sugiyama of Japan.

In 2006, Bhupathi teamed with Martina Hingis in the Australian Open mixed doubles competition. Entering the tournament unseeded and as wildcards, the first-time pair defeated four seeded opponents along the way, while only dropping a single set throughout. Bhupathi and Hingis defeated the sixth-seeded team of Daniel Nestor and Elena Likhovtseva in straight sets, 6–3, 6–3, to capture the championship. It was the sixth mixed doubles Grand Slam for Bhupathi, and the first one for Hingis. By winning the Australian Open, Bhupathi completed a career Grand Slam in mixed doubles.

2007–2008
In 2007, Bhupathi and Radek Štěpánek reached the 2007 Australian Open men's doubles event's quarterfinals. Bhupathi teamed with Štěpánek at the 2007 French Open to make the doubles semifinals, defeating two-year defending champions Jonas Björkman and Max Mirnyi in the quarterfinals. The team lost to the eventual champions Mark Knowles and Daniel Nestor. After Wimbledon, Bhupathi teamed with Pavel Vízner to win the 2007 Canada Masters, defeating the top-ranked doubles team Bob and Mike Bryan en route. After this victory, he won a tournament in New Haven with Nenad Zimonjić. At the 2007 US Open, he and Zimonjić paired in doubles. After the US Open, the team that beat Bhupathi and Štěpánek in the French Open semifinals, Knowles and Nestor, split up. Bhupathi became Knowles' partner, while Zimonjić became Nestor's, but back surgery meant he was out until the end of the year.

2009–2012
In 2009, Bhupathi and compatriot Sania Mirza won the mixed doubles title at the Australian Open, beating Nathalie Dechy and Andy Ram, 6–3, 6–1, in the final. The Indian pair thus made up for the disappointment of the previous year's final when they were beaten by Sun Tiantian and Nenad Zimonjić. With this win, Bhupathi's count in mixed doubles Grand Slam titles increased to seven.

Bhupathi broke up his partnership with Knowles and began playing once again with Max Mirnyi, with whom he played to win the 2002 US Open. In 2011, Bhupathi reunited with former playing partner Leander Paes for the 2011 Australian Open. The team reached the final, but lost 3–6, 4–6 to the Bryan brothers. On 7 June 2012, Bhupathi and Sania Mirza won the French Open mixed doubles.
On 4 November 2012, Bhupathi and partner Rohan Bopanna won the Paris Masters cup. In spite of suffering a setback with their loss against Jonathan Marray and Frederik Nielsen in the ATP Tour Finals opener, the Indian duo reached the final round of the ATP Tour Finals, but suffered a defeat at the hands of Marcel Granollers and Marc López.

2013
Bhupathi and Bopanna played with different partners for the first three months of 2013, Bhupathi winning the tournament in Dubai in March with Michaël Llodra, but rejoined starting with the Monte-Carlo Masters.

Early life 
Mahesh Shrinivas Bhupathi was born on 07 June 1974 in a Telugu family  in Chennai, India.

Playing style
Mahesh Bhupathi is known for his big serve. According to Nadal, his strong backhand makes him the best for an Ad Court player. Roger Federer acclaims him as one of the best players of all time. He often discusses strategies between the serves with his partner during the match and also communicates using finger-at-the-back signals.

Year-end finals
Bhupathi appeared with Paes in six season finales. In 2011, they appeared, for the first time since 2002, after securing qualification in mid-October.

Bhupathi played at the year-end championships with Paes from 1997 to 2000 and in 2002, reaching three finals. In 1997, they lost the final to Rick Leach and Jonathan Stark. They lost the 1999 final to Sébastien Lareau and Alex O’Brien. In 2000, they lost the final to Donald Johnson and Pieter Norval.

Bhupathi also qualified with Max Mirnyi in 2003, 2004, and 2010, when they finished runners-up to Daniel Nestor and Nenad Zimonjić.

He appeared at the finals with Mark Knowles in 2008 and 2009.

In 2012, he and Rohan Bopanna made it to the final, where they lost to Marcel Granollers and Marc López.

Significant finals

Grand Slam tournament finals

Doubles: 10 (4 titles, 6 runner-ups)

Mixed doubles: 12 (8 titles, 4 runner-ups)
By winning the 2006 Australian Open title, Bhupathi completed the mixed doubles Career Grand Slam. He became the eighth male player in history to achieve this.

Olympic medal matches

Doubles: 1 (1 fourth place)

ATP career finals

Doubles: 96 (52–44)

Performance timelines

Doubles

Mixed doubles

Davis Cup and Asian Games
Bhupathi has donned Indian colours numerous times for the Davis Cup as well as other international tournaments, including the Asian Games.

Bhupathi has played 55 matches for India in the Davis Cup (from 1995 to 2011), winning 35 and losing 20. Out of the 35 matches that he won, 27 of his victories came in doubles matches.

In 2006, Bhupathi won the doubles championship with Leander Paes at the Asian Games in Doha.

Personal life

In 2001, he was awarded the Padma Shri, one of India's highest civilian awards. Bhupathi is an alumnus of the University of Mississippi in the United States. He is the founder of Globosport India private Limited which he started in 2002 as a sports and entertainment agency.

He married model Shvetha Jaishankar in 2002 but the couple got divorced in 2009 after seven years of marriage. He then married Miss Universe 2000 Lara Dutta in a civil ceremony on 16 February 2011 at Bandra, Mumbai. It was followed by a Christian ceremony on 20 February 2011 at Sunset Point in Goa.

On 1 August 2011, Dutta confirmed that she was pregnant with their first child. Their daughter Saira was born on 20 January 2012. In 2010, the couple started a film production company, Big Daddy Productions.

In 2014, Mahesh Bhupathi launched an authentic Indian sports brand, ZEVEN. The company currently endorses Ravindra Jadeja, Rohan Bopanna, Shikhar Dhawan and Mary Kom, amongst others.

Partnerships

Partners in doubles

Partners in mixed doubles

These lists only consists of players who played with Mahesh Bhupathi in ATP(& ITF)-recognized tournaments which include the Olympics, Grand Slams, World Tour Finals, World Tour Masters, World Tour Series, Davis Cup Ties, and ATP Challengers. The lists might be incomplete when all the other tournaments are considered. The order of the players in the list is based on their first partnering with Mahesh Bhupathi.

Other partners

India – Asian Games/Commonwealth Games/Other Events

  Leander Paes

Partnership with Leander Paes

Bhupathi and Leander Paes partnered in the men's doubles event at the 2008 Summer Olympics in Beijing, but lost the quarterfinals, to Roger Federer and Stanislas Wawrinka of Switzerland, who went on to win the gold medal.

Paes and Bhupathi decided to team up again at the Australian Open 2011, ending a nine-year separation on the ATP circuit. They reached the finals of the event, but lost to American twins Bob and Mike Bryan. Paes stated at the time that the best thing has been to have their friendship back.

The Indian duo has a 303–103 career record together. They have a Davis Cup record of longest winning streak in doubles, with 23 straight wins.

Leander Paes wanted to play with Mahesh Bhupathi in the men's doubles event of the London Olympics, to be held July–August 2012.
On 19 June 2012, the All India Tennis association relented to the demands of Bhupathi and Bopanna of not playing along Paes. Two teams were sent for the London Olympics- 2012, with Mahesh Bhupathi and Rohan Bopanna as one team and the other team consisting of Leander Paes and Vishnu Vardhan. Bhupathi also accused AITA of using Sania Mirza as bait for Leander's participation in the Olympics. When AITA relented to the wishes of Bhupathi and Bopanna and permitted them to play together, they lost in the second round to the unseeded French pairing of Richard Gasquet and Julien Benneteau.

Davis Cup record

The duo of Bhupathi and Paes has the longest doubles streak in Davis Cup history.

Sports management and sports-based e-commerce
Bhupathi has also been involved in developing tennis facilities in India and, along with his company Globosport, has played a key role in developing and managing the careers of many Indian athletes, including Sania Mirza.

International Premier Tennis League
Mahesh Bhupathi announced the founding of the International Premier Tennis League on 25 May 2013, in Paris. The initial plan was to start the league with six charter franchises in Asia with the inaugural season commencing in November 2014. Bhupathi said the league would be modeled after the Indian Premier League, a cricket league in India. Justin Gimelstob said that the league would be star-driven as World Team Tennis was in the 1970s.

In popular culture
Break Point - A documentary series of Zee5 app released in 2021 unfolding the ups and downs in the relationship between Leander Paes and Mahesh Bhupathi.

Awards 

 Padma Shri, 2001
 Sports people for Change Karmaveer Puraskaar, 2007, iCONGO-Confederation of NGOs
 Davis Cup Commitment Award

Notes

References

External links

 
 
 
 www.cmpaul.wordpress.com

1974 births
Living people
Asian Games gold medalists for India
Asian Games medalists in tennis
Australian Open (tennis) champions
French Open champions
Indian Christians
Indian male tennis players
Ole Miss Rebels men's tennis players
Olympic tennis players of India
Racket sportspeople from Bangalore
Racket sportspeople from Chennai
Recipients of the Arjuna Award
Recipients of the Padma Shri in sports
Telugu people
Tennis players at the 1996 Summer Olympics
Tennis players at the 2000 Summer Olympics
Tennis players at the 2004 Summer Olympics
Tennis players at the 2008 Summer Olympics
Tennis players at the 2012 Summer Olympics
US Open (tennis) champions
Wimbledon champions
Grand Slam (tennis) champions in mixed doubles
Grand Slam (tennis) champions in men's doubles
Tennis players at the 1998 Asian Games
Tennis players at the 2002 Asian Games
Tennis players at the 2006 Asian Games
Asian Games silver medalists for India
Asian Games bronze medalists for India
Commonwealth Games bronze medallists for India
Tennis players at the 2010 Commonwealth Games
Commonwealth Games medallists in tennis
Medalists at the 1998 Asian Games
Medalists at the 2002 Asian Games
Medalists at the 2006 Asian Games
ATP number 1 ranked doubles tennis players
ITF World Champions
Medallists at the 2010 Commonwealth Games